Duan Yingying and Han Xinyun were the defending champions, but did not participate this year.

Lyudmyla and Nadiia Kichenok won the title, defeating Shuko Aoyama and Lidziya Marozava in the final, 6–4, 3–6, [10–7].

Players

Draw

Final

Lily group

Bougainvillea group

References

Doubles Draw

WTA Elite Trophy
WTA Elite Trophy
2018 in Chinese tennis